Paroedura stellata is a species of lizard in the family Gekkonidae. It is endemic to the Comoro Islands.

References

Paroedura
Reptiles described in 2012